John Larch (born Harold Aronin; October 4, 1914 – October 16, 2005; also credited Harry Larch) was an American radio, film, and television actor.

Early life and military service
John Larch was born Harold Aronin to Jewish parents in Salem, Massachusetts, in 1914. Nicknamed "Harry" in childhood, Larch was the younger of two children of Mitchell Aronin and Rose (née Larch) Aronin, both of whom immigrated to the United States from Russian-occupied areas of Poland prior to 1908. According to Massachusetts birth registries and federal census records, Mitchell supported his family as a "cutter" in shoe factories. By 1920, the Aronins had moved to New York City, where Mitchell continued to work as a shoe cutter.

Larch served four years in the United States Army during World War II, an experience that left him troubled for years after his discharge. In a 1965 interview with The Berkshire Eagle, a newspaper in his home state, he shared his views on how military service had affected him personally, especially his difficulties in readjusting to civilian life:What was my hangup then? Just about everything. I was looking for the four years I had lost in service. I was also looking for a rhyme or reason to the mass murders that took place. I was looking for the ideals I had once had. I was disgusted with the world — a world in which civilians acted as though there hadn't been a worldwide holocaust.

Film

After his lead role in the radio serial Captain Starr of Space during the broadcast season of 1953–1954, he began to perform increasingly in films. He was usually cast on the "big screen" in Westerns (How The West Was Won, 1962) and in other action films outside that genre, including Miracle of the White Stallions as General George S. Patton Jr. (1963), the television film Collision Course: Truman vs. MacArthur as General Omar Bradley (1976), and replacing James Gregory as Mac in the Matt Helm movie The Wrecking Crew (1969) starring Dean Martin, Sharon Tate, and Elke Sommer. Larch also appears  in two 1971 Clint Eastwood films, Dirty Harry and Play Misty for Me.

Television
Larch had the role of Captain Ben Foster on the NBC series Convoy (1965-1966). He guest-starred in Jefferson Drum; Johnny Ringo; Riverboat; Naked City (three episodes); Stoney Burke; Route 66 (three episodes); The Fugitive (two episodes); The Invaders; The Restless Gun (four episodes); Gunsmoke (seven episodes); The Virginian (four episodes, one of which was in 1970 as the Sheriff on The Men From Shiloh, which was the rebranded name that year for The Virginian); Bonanza; The Man From U.N.C.L.E.; Hawaii Five-0; Mission Impossible (two episodes); The Troubleshooters; Bus Stop; The Law and Mr. Jones; Bat Masterson (season one, episode 30, which aired on 27 May 1959); The Rifleman; the final episode of the James Stewart legal drama Hawkins; The Feather and Father Gang; The Millionaire; three episodes of Twilight Zone: "Perchance to Dream", "Dust", and "It's a Good Life", in which he played Bill Mumy's father with Mumy as a young boy; Rawhide, in the episode "Incident At Sugar Creek" (1962) as Sam Garrett; Vega$, in the season three episode "Deadly Blessing"; Dynasty (seven episodes); and Dallas (seven episodes). He also starred as hunter Sam in Daniel Boone in the episode, Chief Mingo. Appeared in [Cannon- TV Private Investigator Series] (1973 TV series) Episode - To Ride A Tiger.

Personal life and death
Larch married actress Vivi Janiss, the former wife of actor Bob Cummings. Larch and Vivi married in Los Angeles in March 1955. Vivi died in 1988. The couple had no children. John continued to reside in Los Angeles, in Woodland Hills, until his death in 2005 at age 91. He is interred in a wall crypt at Mount Sinai Memorial Park in nearby Hollywood Hills.

Joint acting appearances with Janiss
During their long acting careers, Larch and his wife Vivi performed together periodically on television. Larch, for example, appears with her in the 1968 episode "Yesterday Died and Tomorrow Won't Be Born" on the CBS weekly crime drama Hawaii Five-O starring Jack Lord. On earlier television series, they appear in the roles of Johnny and Elsie in the 1959 episode "End of an Era" on NBC's Western series Tales of Wells Fargo; as Isaiah and Rebecca Macabee in the 1960 episode "The Proud Earth" on the NBC anthology series Goodyear Theatre; as another married couple, Ben and Sarah Harness, in the 1960 episode "The Cathy Eckhart Story" on NBC's Wagon Train; and as John and Mary Clark in "No Fat Cops", the 1961 premiere episode of The New Breed starring Leslie Nielsen.

Partial filmography

Bitter Creek (1954) - Hired Gunman
This Is My Love (1954) - Police Detective (uncredited)
Tight Spot (1955) - First Detective (uncredited)
Seven Angry Men (1955) - Truce Flag-Bearing Sergeant (uncredited)
5 Against the House (1955) - Police Detective (uncredited)
The Phenix City Story (1955) - Clem Wilson
Gunsmoke (1955) - Clay
The Naked Street (1955) - Police Desk Sergeant (uncredited)
The McConnell Story (1955) - Cy (uncredited)
Illegal (1955) - District Attorney's Man (uncredited)
The Killer Is Loose (1956) - Otto Flanders
Behind the High Wall (1956) - William Kiley
Seven Men from Now (1956) - Payte Bodeen
Written on the Wind (1956) - Roy Carter
Man from Del Rio (1956) - Bill Dawson
Gun for a Coward (1957) - Stringer
The Careless Years (1957) - Sam Vernon
Quantez (1957) - Heller
Man in the Shadow (1957) - Ed Yates
From Hell to Texas (1958) - Hal Carmody
The Restless Gun (1958) - as Sheriff Ryker in Episode "Hornitas Town"
The Restless Gun (1958) - as Red Eye Kirk in "The Crisis at Easter Creek"
The Restless Gun (1958) - as the Sheriff in "Thunder Valley"
The Saga of Hemp Brown (1958) - Jed Givens
The Walter Winchell File (1958, "Portrait of A Cop") - LT. Janiss
Hell to Eternity (1960) - Capt. Schwabe
Gunsmoke (1961) - Shanks
How the West Was Won (1962) - Grimes (uncredited)
Miracle of the White Stallions (1963) - Gen. George S. Patton, Jr.
The Wrecking Crew (1969) - MacDonald
The Great Bank Robbery (1969) - Sheriff of Friendly
Hail, Hero! (1969) - Mr. Conklin
Move (1970) - Mounted Patrolman
Cannon for Cordoba (1970) - Warner
Play Misty for Me (1971) - Sgt. McCallum
Dirty Harry (1971) - Chief
Women in Chains (1972) - Barney
Santee (1973) - Banner
Winter Kill (1974, TV Movie) - Dr. Bill Hammond
Bad Ronald (1974, TV Movie) - Sgt. Lynch
Framed (1975) - Bundy
The Amityville Horror (1979) - Father Nuncio
Airplane II: The Sequel (1982) - Prosecuting Attorney

References

External links
 
 

1914 births
2005 deaths
Male actors from Massachusetts
American male film actors
American male television actors
People from Salem, Massachusetts
Male actors from Los Angeles
Burials at Mount Sinai Memorial Park Cemetery
Western (genre) television actors
20th-century American male actors
Jewish American male actors
American people of Polish-Jewish descent
American people of Russian-Jewish descent
20th-century American Jews
21st-century American Jews